Heider Hassan (born October 20, 1982) is an American mixed martial artist who currently competes at Brave Combat Federation. A professional competitor since 2009, he has competed for the UFC, Strikeforce, Titan FC, King of the Cage, the Xtreme Fighting Championships, and was a contestant on The Ultimate Fighter: American Top Team vs. Blackzilians as well as The Ultimate Fighter: Redemption.

Background
Born and raised in Florida, Hassan and his family were refugees from Baghdad, Iraq who relocated in 1977. His father, who was a physician, personally trekked from their home in Iraq to an American embassy. Hassan attended Cardinal Gibbons High School, where he was a standout in wrestling and football before graduating from Florida State University after which he had planned to attend medical school and majored in sociology. However, after leaving his job as a sales representative for a pharmaceutical firm, he transitioned to a career in MMA and began training at the American Top Team academy in Coconut Creek.

Mixed martial arts career

The Ultimate Fighter
Hassan competed on the 21st season of the reality show The Ultimate Fighter, representing American Top Team and making it to the final. In his first fight he defeated Andrews Nakahara via TKO in the first round.  In his second fight he defeated Felipe Portela by majority decision. In his third fight he faced Vicente Luque and won via split decision.

Ultimate Fighting Championship
Hassan made his debut with the Ultimate Fighting Championship on July 12, 2015 against Kamaru Usman at The Ultimate Fighter 21 Finale. He lost the bout via submission in the second round.

Hassan next faced former opponent Vicente Luque at UFC on Fox 17 on December 19, 2015. He lost the fight via technical submission in the first round and was subsequently released from the promotion.

The Ultimate Fighter: Redemption
In February 2017, it was revealed that Hassan would compete again on the UFC's reality show in the 25th season on The Ultimate Fighter: Redemption. Hassan was the fifth pick overall for Team Garbrandt. He faced Dhiego Lima in the opening round and lost by unanimous decision. He defeated former world title contender Joe Stevenson by knockout in the wildcard bout.

Mixed martial arts record

|-
|Loss
|align=center|9–5
|Carl Booth
|Decision (unanimous)
|Brave Combat Federation
|
|align=center|3
|align=center|5:00
|Bishkek, Kyrgyzstan
|
|-
|Win
|align=center|9–4
|Movsar Bokov
|Decision (unanimous)
|M-1 Challenge 103
|
|align=center|3
|align=center|5:00
|Shenzhen, China
|
|-
|Win
|align=center|8–4
|Hemant Wadekar
|TKO (knee and punches)
|Kumite 1 League 
|
|align=center|1
|align=center|0:34
|Mumbai, India 
|
|-
|Win
|align=center|7–4
|Pavel Kusch 
|Decision (unanimous)
|Phoenix FC 6
|
|align=center|3
|align=center|5:00
|Abu Dhabi, United Arab Emirates
|
|-
|Loss
|align=center|6–4
|Roger Huerta
|DQ (illegal Elbows)
|Phoenix FC 4
|
|align=center|2
|align=center|0:53
|Abu Dhabi, United Arab Emirates
|
|-
|Loss
|align=center|6–3
|Vicente Luque
|Technical Submission (anaconda choke)
|UFC on Fox: dos Anjos vs. Cowboy 2
|
|align=center|1
|align=center|2:13
|Orlando, Florida, United States
|
|-
|Loss
|align=center|6–2
|Kamaru Usman
|Submission (arm-triangle choke)
|The Ultimate Fighter: American Top Team vs. Blackzilians Finale
|
|align=center|2
|align=center|1:19
|Las Vegas, Nevada, United States
| 
|-
|Win
|align=center|6–1
|Felipe Portela
|TKO (punch)
|Titan FC 31
|
|align=center|1
|align=center|3:23
|Tampa, Florida, United States
|
|-
|Win
|align=center|5–1
|Jason Jackson
|TKO (punches)
|CFA 12
|
|align=center|3
|align=center|2:32
|Coral Gables, Florida, United States
|
|-
|Win
|align=center|4–1
| Robert Thompson
| Decision (unanimous)
| MFA: New Generation 1
| 
|align=center| 3
|align=center| 5:00
| Miami, Florida, United States
|
|-
|Win
|align=center|3–1
|Ryan Keenan
|KO (punch)
|Strikeforce: Miami
|
|align=center|2
|align=center|2:42
|Miami, Florida, United States
|
|-
|Loss
|align=center|2–1
|Gerardo Julio Gallegos
|TKO (punches)
|XFC 9: Evolution
|
|align=center|1
|align=center|0:57
|Tampa, Florida, United States
|
|-
|Win
|align=center|2–0
|Roy McDonald
|TKO (punches)
|RW3: Florida
|
|align=center|1
|align=center|3:19
|Fort Lauderdale, Florida, United States
|
|-
|Win
|align=center|1–0
|Kenny Allen
|TKO (punches)
|KOTC: Hurricane
|
|align=center|1
|align=center|0:09
|Fort Lauderdale, Florida, United States
|
|-

Mixed martial arts exhibition record

|-
|Loss
|align=center|4–2
|Jesse Taylor
| Submission (rear-naked-choke)
|rowspan=3|The Ultimate Fighter: Redemption
|  (airdate)
| align=center|1
| align=center|1:24
|rowspan=3| Las Vegas, Nevada, United States
|
|-
|Win
|align=center|4–1
|Joe Stevenson
|KO (punch)
| (airdate)
|align=center|1
|align=center|0:18
|
|-
|Loss
|align=center|3–1
|Dhiego Lima
|Decision (unanimous)
| (airdate)
|align=center|2
|align=center|5:00
|
|-
|Win
|align=center|3–0
|Vicente Luque
|Decision (split)
|rowspan=3|The Ultimate Fighter: American Top Team vs. Blackzilians
| (airdate)
|align=center|3
|align=center|5:00
| Coconut Creek, Florida, United States
|rowspan=3|TUF 21.
|-
|win
|align=center|2–0
|Felipe Portela
|Decision (majority)
| (airdate)
|align=center|2
|align=center|5:00
|rowspan=2|Boca Raton, Florida, United States
|-
|Win
|align=center|1–0
|Andrews Nakahara
|TKO (punches)
| (airdate)
|align=center|1
| align=center|0:48

See also

List of male mixed martial artists

References

External links
http://www.sherdog.com/fighter/Hayder-Hassan-46033
http://www.ufc.com/fighter/hayder-hassan
https://www.tapology.com/fightcenter/fighters/hayder-hassan-hulk

Living people
1982 births
American male mixed martial artists
Welterweight mixed martial artists
Mixed martial artists utilizing wrestling
American people of Iraqi descent
Sportspeople from Fort Lauderdale, Florida
Mixed martial artists from Florida
Ultimate Fighting Championship male fighters